Jim Patterson is an American producer and screenwriter. He is the co-creator of the American comedy-drama television series The Ranch, which he created with Don Reo. He has been nominated for two Primetime Emmy Awards in the category Outstanding Comedy Series for his work on the television program Two and a Half Men.

References

External links 

Living people
Place of birth missing (living people)
Year of birth missing (living people)
American male screenwriters
American television writers
American male television writers
American television producers
Showrunners